Jules Pouget (8 March 1884 - 30 July 1963) was a French politician. He served as a member of the French Senate from 1948 to 1952, representing Pas-de-Calais.

References

1884 births
1963 deaths
People from Aveyron
People from Pas-de-Calais
French Senators of the Fourth Republic
Senators of Pas-de-Calais